Rubén Inácio (born 5 November 1958) is an Angolan sprinter. He competed in the men's 200 metres at the 1980 Summer Olympics.

References

External links
 

1958 births
Living people
Athletes (track and field) at the 1980 Summer Olympics
Angolan male sprinters
Olympic athletes of Angola
World Athletics Championships athletes for Angola
Place of birth missing (living people)